Joleen Evans (born July 29, 1960) is the head coach of the UC-Santa Barbara softball team. She was the head coach for Texas A&M from 1997 to 2022. Prior to that, she served as the head coach for the Utah Utes from 1990–1996 and for the Colorado State Rams from 1986–1989. She started her coaching career as an assistant coach for Florida State in 1984. She has won conference coach of the year honors seven times over her head coaching career.

While attending the University of Utah, Evans played on the Utah Utes softball team from 1979 to 1982 at pitcher and second base. She compiled 13 triples over her career, ranking second in school history in that category. In her 1981 season, she posted 7 triples, tying with three other Utah players for first place in season triple count.

Awards and honors
NFCA Hall of Fame Inductee (2015)
HCAC Coach of the Year (1988, 1989)
WAC Coach of the Year (1991, 1994)
Big 12 Coach of the Year (2004, 2005, 2008)
National Fastpitch Coaches Association Midwest Region Coaching Staff of the Year (2008)

Head coaching record

See also
List of college softball coaches with 1,000 wins

References

External links
Texas A&M bio

1960 births
Living people
Softball players from Utah
Female sports coaches
American softball coaches
Utah Utes softball players
Colorado State Rams softball coaches
Florida State Seminoles softball coaches
Sportspeople from Salt Lake City
Texas A&M Aggies softball coaches
Texas A&M University faculty
Utah Utes softball coaches
American women academics